This is a list of lighthouses in east Timor.

Lighthouses

See also
 Lists of lighthouses and lightvessels

References

External links
 

East Timor
Lighthouses
Lighthouses